Love & Lies, a Filipino suspense-action drama television series created by RJ Nuevas, developed by Richard Cruz and produced and broadcast by GMA Network. The series premiered on April 8, 2013 on the network's GMA Telebabad slot and on April 9, 2013 worldwide via GMA Pinoy TV. The concluded its nine weeks run on June 7, 2013 with the total of forty-four episodes.

The forty-five-minute scripted drama follows the life and love Edward Galvez, a fictional Philippine Navy officer, who gets tangled in a web of lies and conspiracies when a mysterious organization suddenly kidnaps his wife. As the protagonist discovers the truth behind the crime, he uncovers a treacherous plot that threatens to turn his world upside-down. The true perpetrators of the crime may be closer to home than he dare think. As he thread to the maze of lies, blackmails, double-dealings, and betrayals, everyone becomes a suspect.

Mark Reyes directed the show, while Leilani Feliciano-Sandoval and Rebya Upalda were the executive producers of the series throughout its nine weeks run, 44 episodes.

Main cast

Richard Gutierrez as Edward Galvez
Bela Padilla as Denise Salvador
Michelle Madrigal as Catherine "Cathy" Galvez
Sid Lucero as Gabriel "Gabby" Romero
Paolo Contis as Emmanuel "Manny" Perez

List of episodes

External links
Official GMA Network website

References

Lists of Philippine drama television series episodes